The European Society for Emergency Medicine (EUSEM) is an organisation promoting international emergency medicine in Europe. The society was founded at the International Conference on Emergency Medicine in May 1994 in London. EUSEM brings together over 30 European national societies of emergency medicine. EUSEM hosts pan-European emergency medicine training, examinations and awards. It also publishes the European Journal of Emergency Medicine, and organises annual scientific meetings.

It is an ex-officio member of the International Federation for Emergency Medicine.

EUSEM Congresses
Until 2014 EUSEM hosted a congress every 2nd year, alternating with a Mediterranean Emergency Medicine Congress co-hosted with the American Academy of Emergency Medicine (AAEM).

See also
 International Conference on Emergency Medicine
 International Federation for Emergency Medicine

References

Emergency medicine organisations
International medical associations of Europe
Medical and health organisations based in Belgium